Mohammadiyeh (also Romanized as Moḩammadīyeh) is a village in Tabadkan Rural District, in the Central District of Mashhad County, Razavi Khorasan Province, Iran. At the 2006 census, its population was 62, in 9 families.

References 

Populated places in Mashhad County